Department of Revenue can refer to agencies of various governments:

India
 Department of Revenue (India)
 Department of Revenue (Tamil Nadu)
 Department of Revenue and Disaster Management, Haryana
 Department of Revenue and Land Survey (Kerala)

Pakistan
Department of Revenue (Pakistan)
Department of Revenue- Government of Balochistan
Department of Revenue- Government of Khyber Pakhtunkhwa
Department of Revenue- Government of Punjab
 Excise and taxation department, Punjab (Pakistan)
Department of Revenue- Government of Sindh

United States
 Internal Revenue Service

 Georgia Department of Revenue
 Illinois Department of Revenue
 Kansas Department of Revenue
 Minnesota Department of Revenue
 Missouri Department of Revenue
 Oregon Department of Revenue
 Pennsylvania Department of Revenue
 South Carolina Department of Revenue
 Tennessee Department of Revenue
 Wisconsin Department of Revenue
 Wyoming Department of Revenue